The New Hotel is a 1932 British musical film directed by Bernard Mainwaring and starring Norman Long, Dan Young and Hal Gordon. It was made at Cricklewood Studios.

Cast
 Norman Long 
 Dan Young 
 Hal Gordon 
 Mickey Brantford as The Newlywed 
 Adele Blanche 
 Alfred Wellesley as Maitre d'Hotel  
 Basil Howes 
 Betty Norton 
 Hamilton Keene 
 Ruth Taylor 
 Al Davidson
 Frank Adey
 Myno Burney 
 James Croome
 Noel Dainton 
 Gilly Flower
 Lindy Jeune 
 Kinsley Lark 
 Percy Val 
 Bert Weston

References

Bibliography
 Low, Rachael. Filmmaking in 1930s Britain. George Allen & Unwin, 1985.
 Wood, Linda. British Films, 1927-1939. British Film Institute, 1986.

External links

1932 films
British musical films
1932 musical films
Films shot at Cricklewood Studios
Films directed by Bernard Mainwaring
Stoll Pictures films
British black-and-white films
1930s English-language films
1930s British films